Inkinga cockae is a species of small sea snail, a marine gastropod mollusk in the family Horaiclavidae.

Description
The length of the shell attains 10 mm.

Distribution
This marine species occurs off False Bay, Southern KwaZulu-Natal, . South Africa

References

 Steyn, D.G. & Lussi, M. (1998) Marine Shells of South Africa. An Illustrated Collector's Guide to Beached Shells. Ekogilde Publishers, Hartebeespoort, South Africa, ii + 264 pp

External links
  Tucker, J.K. 2004 Catalog of recent and fossil turrids (Mollusca: Gastropoda). Zootaxa 682:1-1295

Endemic fauna of South Africa
cockae
Gastropods described in 1977